Haseeb-ul-Hasan was a Pakistani first-class cricketer. He played domestic matches for team Karachi, Karachi Blues and Karachi Whites. Haseeb-ul-Hasan was born on 11 May 1964 in Karachi and died on 18 April 1990, when he was murdered by an unknown gunman.

References

1964 births
1990 deaths
Male murder victims
Pakistani cricketers
Karachi cricketers
Karachi Blues cricketers
Karachi Whites cricketers
Pakistani murder victims
Cricketers from Karachi
People murdered in Karachi
Deaths by firearm in Sindh